Hurricane Gert was the fourth of five major hurricanes in the moderately active 1999 Atlantic hurricane season. A Cape Verde tropical cyclone, Gert formed on September 11 off the coast of Africa before heading west-northwest. It reached a peak wind speed of 150 mph (240 km/h) by September 15 over the open central Atlantic east-northeast of the Leeward Islands. It gradually curved to the northwest and later to the north, due to a weakness in the subtropical ridge created by Hurricane Floyd. Hurricane Gert passed east of Bermuda on September 21 and began a steady weakening trend at that time. It turned to the northeast, and on September 23, Gert transitioned into an extratropical cyclone to the southeast of Atlantic Canada before being absorbed by a larger storm.

For several days, Gert threatened to strike Bermuda, prompting the evacuation of tourists. Although Gert's center did not make landfall, it passed a short distance east of the island, producing hurricane-force winds that left 11,000 people without power. High waves swept two people out to sea at Acadia National Park in Maine. Later, strong waves struck Newfoundland and left heavy marine damage.

Meteorological history

A tropical wave moved off the coast of Africa on September 10, with evidence of a low-level circulation and convective banding. It moved west-northwestward, located south of a subtropical ridge. Based on satellite imagery, it is estimated the system organized into Tropical Depression Nine by 1200 UTC on September 11 to the south of the Cape Verde islands. Upon its formation, the center was poorly defined, with restricted easterly outflow due to easterly wind shear. After about 24 hours of remaining somewhat disorganized, the convection became more concentrated on September 12 as banding features and outflow improved. Consequently, the National Hurricane Center (NHC) upgraded the depression to Tropical Storm Gert, the seventh named storm of the season.

After becoming a tropical storm, Gert quickly intensified due to the presence of an anticyclone aloft, as well as warm water temperatures exceeding 84 °F (29 °C). Following the development of a warm spot near the center, Gert intensified into a hurricane on September 13. It strengthened further, developing an eye that briefly dissipated before reforming. Early on September 15, Gert attained major hurricane strength, or a Category 3 on the Saffir-Simpson scale. Still moving west-northwestward, Gert continued its steady intensification trend, developing well-defined outflow throughout the circulation that was described as "outstanding". After reaching Category 4 status on September 15, Gert strengthened further to peak winds of  early on September 16, as estimated on satellite imagery through the Dvorak technique. At the time, the hurricane was located about 720 mi (1160 km) east-northeast of Guadeloupe in the Lesser Antilles. Around the time of peak intensity, Gert maintained a round central dense overcast. Hurricane Hunters investigated the hurricane on September 16 and indicated a slight weakening trend due to an eyewall replacement cycle. Gradually Gert turned toward the northwest due to a weakness in the subtropical ridge, created by Hurricane Floyd to the west. As it did so, the hurricane re-intensified briefly before resuming a weakening trend, due to increased wind shear and an upper-level trough to its west restricting outflow.

By September 20, while the hurricane was approaching Bermuda, the appearance became more ragged due to the intrusion of unfavorable dry air. Early on September 21 Gert weakened to Category 2 intensity, around the same time it turned northward. Steady weakening continued as Gert accelerated northeastward under the influence of an approaching trough. The convection decreased around the center due to cooler water temperatures, and on September 23 Gert weakened to tropical storm status as it approached Newfoundland. After nearly all of the convection had dissipated, the system no longer met the characteristics of a tropical cyclone. As a result, it was declared extratropical at 1200 UTC on September 23 about 55 mi (90 km) southeast of Cape Race, Newfoundland. About six hours later, the remnants of Gert were absorbed by a larger extratropical storm. Gert was the fourth of five Category 4 hurricanes to form during the 1999 season, the highest number of such storms on record. Later, the 2005 season tied the record.

Preparations and impact

Bermuda
As Gert was several days away from Bermuda, the NHC advised residents there to monitor the progress of the storm, Due to uncertainties in the future forecast, as well as the size and strength of Gert, a tropical storm warning and hurricane watch was issued for the island on September 19, about two days prior to its closest approach. As Gert moved closer to the island, the watch and warning were replaced by a hurricane warning on September 20, which was maintained until the following day after Gert moved further away. Before Gert passed by the island, officials closed two schools and converted them to emergency shelters. Police workers advised 700 families to leave their houses. Cruise lines diverted ships away, while hundreds of tourists took flights to leave the island.

Elsewhere on the island, wind gusts peaked at  along the coast, while 1-minute sustained winds reached 80 mph (130 km/h) along the harbor. Rainfall on the island was light, totaling only . Rough surf battered the island, resulting in extensive beach erosion. The well-known Natural Arches were damaged, and part of a house collapsed into the sea. Severe damage was reported along the southern shore of the island. Approximately 11,000 residents suffered temporary power outages. Several roads were flooded, and the intense winds downed trees. However, the storm's worst effects remained offshore.

United States and Canada
On September 20, Hurricane Gert was attributed to generating a rogue wave that swept two people out to sea at Acadia National Park along the coast of Maine. The crew of a lobster boat later found their bodies.

Late in its duration, Gert passed just southeast of Newfoundland before becoming extratropical, producing wave heights of 77.4 ft (23.6 m) offshore and 30 ft (9 m) onshore. In St. Bride's along the Avalon Peninsula, a large wave severely damaged a wharf, destroying five boats and damaging 45 others. Along the wharf, a wave swept three people into the ocean, hospitalizing one of them. The wharf required $2 million (1999 CAD, $1.9 million 1999 USD) in repairs, forcing its closure. Further west, high waves damaged a fish plant in Lord's Cove. Gale-force winds extended across southeastern Newfoundland, and in the Grand Banks a station reported winds of 74 mph (120 km/h). Onshore, the winds downed trees and caused power outages, primarily in the St. John's area. In addition, the adverse conditions from Gert prompted the cancellation of flights to and from St. John's International Airport.

See also

 Other storms of the same name
 List of Bermuda hurricanes
 List of Category 4 Atlantic hurricanes

Sources

Gert
Gert (1999)
Gert (1999)
Gert (1999)
Gert (1999)
Gert 1999
1999 in Bermuda
1999 in Maine
1999 disasters in Canada
1999 natural disasters in the United States